Shadowhunters is an American supernatural drama television series. The series is based on the book series The Mortal Instruments by Cassandra Clare, and developed for television by Ed Decter. It premiered in North America on Freeform. In December 2015, Netflix acquired global rights to Shadowhunters, excluding the U.S., making the series available as an original series a day after the U.S. premiere.

Shadowhunters follows Clary Fray (Katherine McNamara), who finds out on her birthday that she is not who she thinks she is but rather comes from a long line of Shadowhunters, human–angel hybrids who hunt down demons. The series is set in an urban and contemporary New York City.  The show received a straight-to-series order on March 30, 2015, and premiered on January 12, 2016 on Freeform.

In June 2018, Freeform canceled the series after three seasons, but ordered two extra episodes to properly conclude the series' story.

Series overview

Episodes

Season 1 (2016)

Season 2 (2017)

Season 3 (2018–19)

Ratings

Season 1

Season 2

Season 3

References

External links
 
 

Lists of American fantasy television series episodes